Chea is a surname in various cultures.

Origins
Chea may be a Cambodian surname. That surname is derived from the Chinese surname Xiè, specifically Southern Min pronunciations of that surname, e.g. Hokkien Chinese. Other spellings derived from Southern Min pronunciations of that Chinese surname include Chia and Cheah.

Chea may also be an alternative spelling of the Korean surname more commonly romanised as Chae.

Statistics
French government statistics show 161 people with the surname Chea born in France from 1991 to 2000, 230 from 1981 to 1990, 45 from 1971 to 1980, five from 1961 to 1970, and none in earlier time periods.

The 2000 South Korean Census found 119,251 people with the family name usually romanised as Chae. This surname is only rarely spelled as Chea; in a study based on year 2007 applications for South Korean passports, 87.8% of the applicants chose to spell this surname as Chae, and 7.5% as Chai, as compared to only 1.7% who chose the spelling Chea.

The 2010 United States Census found 4,492 people with the surname Chea, making it the 7,411th-most-common name in the country. This represented an increase from 3,404 (8,850th-most-common) in the 2000 Census. In both censuses, slightly more than four-fifths of the bearers of the surname identified as Asian, while the proportion of bearers who identified as black increased from 4.9% in the 2000 Census to 6.3% in the 2010 Census. Chea was the 359th-most-common surname among respondents to the 2000 Census who identified as Asian.

People
Cambodian surname Chea:
Chea Soth (1928–2012), Cambodian politician, MP for Prey Veng Province
Chea Sim (1932–2015), Cambodian politician, President of the National Assembly (1981–1998)
Chea Sophara (born 1953), Cambodian politician, Minister of Rural Development (2008–2016)
Chea Vichea (1968–2004), Cambodian trade unionist
Chea Poch (born 1974), Cambodian politician, MP for Prey Veng Province
Chea Samnang (born 1994), Cambodian football midfielder

Other:
José Luis Chea Urruela, Guatemalan politician
Alvin Chea (born 1967), American gospel singer
Chea Song-joo (born 1998), South Korean figure skater
Leanna Chea, French actress

See also
Chea Cheapoo (born 1942), Liberian judge
Nuon Chea (born Lau Kim Korn, 1926–2019), Cambodian war criminal and deputy to Pol Pot

References

Chinese-language surnames
Multiple Chinese surnames
Surnames of Cambodian origin
Khmer-language surnames